Colubridae (commonly known as colubrids , from , 'snake') is a family of snakes. With 249 genera, it is the largest snake family. The earliest species of the family date back to the Oligocene epoch. Colubrid snakes are found on every continent except Antarctica.

Description
While most colubrids are not venomous (or have venom that is not known to be harmful to humans) and are mostly harmless, a few groups, such as genus Boiga, can produce medically significant injuries. In addition, the boomslang, the twig snakes, and the Asian genus Rhabdophis have caused human fatalities.

Some colubrids are described as opisthoglyphous (often called "rear-fanged"), meaning they have elongated, grooved teeth located in the back of their upper jaws. It is likely that opisthoglyphous dentition evolved many times in the history of snakes and is an evolutionary precursor to the fangs of vipers and elapids, which are located in the front of the mouth.

Classification
In the past, the Colubridae were not a natural group, as many were more closely related to other groups, such as elapids, than to each other. This family was historically used as a "wastebasket taxon" for snakes that do not fit elsewhere. Until recently, colubrids were basically colubroids that were not elapids, viperids, or Atractaspis.

However, recent research in molecular phylogenetics has stabilized the classification of historically "colubrid" snakes and the family as currently defined is a monophyletic clade, although additional research will be necessary to sort out all the relationships within this group. As of May 2018, eight subfamilies are recognized.

Current subfamilies

Sibynophiinae – two genera

Natricinae – 36 genera (sometimes given as family Natricidae)

Pseudoxenodontinae – two genera

Dipsadinae – over 100 genera (sometimes given as family Dipsadidae)

Grayiinae – one genus
Grayia

Calamariinae – seven genera

Ahaetuliinae – five genera

Colubrinae –  94 genera

Sub-family currently undetermined
Elapoidis
Gongylosoma
Lycognathophis
Oreocalamus
Tetralepis

Former subfamilies
These taxa have been at one time or another classified as part of the Colubridae, but are now either classified as parts of other families, or are no longer accepted because all the species within them have been moved to other (sub)families.

Subfamily Aparallactinae (now a subfamily of Lamprophiidae, sometimes combined with Atractaspidinae)
Subfamily Boiginae (now part of Colubrinae)
Subfamily Boodontinae (some of which now treated as subfamily Grayiinae of the new Colubridae, others moved to family Lamprophiidae as part of subfamilies Lamprophiinae, Pseudaspidinae and Pseudoxyrhophiidae, which are now sometimes treated as families)
Subfamily Dispholidinae (now part of Colubrinae)
Subfamily Homalopsinae (now family Homalopsidae)
Subfamily Lamprophiinae (now a subfamily of Lamprophiidae)
Subfamily Lycodontinae (now part of Colubrinae)
Subfamily Lycophidinae (now part of Lamprophiidae)
Subfamily Pareatinae (now family Pareidae, sometimes incorrectly spelled Pareatidae)
Subfamily Philothamninae (now part of Colubrinae)
Subfamily Psammophiinae (now a subfamily of Lamprophiidae)
Subfamily Pseudoxyrhophiinae (now a subfamily of Lamprophiidae)
Subfamily Xenoderminae (now family Xenodermidae, sometimes incorrectly spelled Xenodermatidae)
Subfamily Xenodontinae (which many authors put in Dipsadinae/Dipsadidae)

Fossil record
The Pliocene (Blancan) fossil record in the Ringold Formation of Adams County, Washington has yielded fossils from a number of colubrids including Elaphe pliocenica, Elaphe vulpina, Lampropeltis getulus,  Pituophis catenifer, a Thamnophis species, and the extinct genus Tauntonophis.

References

Citations

Bibliography

External links
 Psammophids at Life Is Short, but Snakes Are Long

 
Cenozoic reptiles
Extant Oligocene first appearances
Snake families
Taxa described in 1881
Taxa named by Nicolaus Michael Oppel